Velké Meziříčí is a town in Žďár nad Sázavou District in the Vysočina Region of the Czech Republic. It has about 11,000 inhabitants. The historic town centre with the castle complex is well preserved and is protected by law as an urban monument zone.

Administrative parts
Villages of Dolní Radslavice, Hrbov, Kúsky, Lhotky, Mostiště, Olší nad Oslavou and Svařenov are administrative parts of Velké Meziříčí.

Etymology
The name Meziříčí literally means "between the rivers" and is related to its location on the confluence of rivers. The attribute Velké (i.e. "Great") was added later to distinguish from places with the same name.

Geography
It is situated in a valley framed by the hills of the Křižanov Highlands. It lies on the confluence of the Oslava and Balinka rivers. A set of ponds is located on the Lovíčský Stream, which flows into the Balinka in the town. Part of the Mostiště reservoir is located in the municipal territory and is the largest water body of the territory.

History

The settlement of Meziříčí was founded during the colonization of the Oslava valley in the 12th century. The first written credible mention of Meziříčí is from 1281. A counterfeit documented existence of Meziříčí in 1236, however, the estimated foundation of the castle above Meziříčí is actually around 1236 and is on the oldest aristocratic castles in Moravia. The palisade and then the stone walls were built in the 14th century. The Church of Saint Nicholas is first mentioned in 1317. The village was located on crossroards of two trade routes and developed into a town.

The settlement obtained full town privileges in 1408. During the Hussite Wars, Meziříčí was a military base of the Hussites. Around 1434, the castle was fortified. In 1464, the castle was conquered by King George of Poděbrady, and in 1468, the town was ransacked by the army of Matthias Corvinus.

Meziříčí experienced the greatest boom during the Renaissance period. The first Jews came into the town in the late 15th century and the Jewish community was established in the 17th century. The prosperity of the town was interrupted by the Thirty Years' War, during which the town was burned down several times. In the 18th century, the town prospered again.

In the 19th century, first factories were built, and the development of the town's industry was also helped by the construction of the railway.

Until 1918, Groß Meseritsch – Velké Meziříčí (German name only before 1867) was part of the Austrian monarchy (Austria side after the compromise of 1867), head of the district with the same name, one of the 34 Bezirkshauptmannschaften in Moravia.

Demographics

Transport
The D1 motorway goes through the town.

Velké Meziříčí lies on a railroad of local importance. The town is served by two train stations.

Sights

The Velké Meziříčí Castle is the landmark of the town. The original Romanesque-Gothic castle was rebuilt in the Renaissance style in the 16th century and after a fire in 1723, Baroque reconstruction was made. Today it houses the Velké Meziříčí Museum. The museum was founded in 1893 and includes historical and scientific collections, a collection of cubist furniture, and an exhibition on the construction of roads and bridges.

The historic centre was delimited by town walls and both rivers. Part of the town walls with a gate are preserved. The landmark of the square is the Church of Saint Nicholas. The square is lined with valuable burgher houses, the most significant buildings are the town hall from the 15th century, and a house called Obecník with rich sgraffito decoration.

Several important monuments remained after the Jewish community. The Old Synagogue was built in 1695 and has a Baroque-Neoclassical portal of the main entrance from the late 18th century. The New Synagogue is from 1870 and is known for its characteristic appearance of unplastered red and black bricks. The Jewish cemetery with 1,101 tombstones comes from the mid-17th century. The oldest preserved tombstone is from 1677. The nearby ceremonial hall is from 1880.

Notable people
Tzvi Ashkenazi (1656–1718) Jewish scholar, rabbi of Amsterdam
Isaac Hirsch Weiss (1815–1905), literature historian
Nathan Weiss (1851–1883), Austrian physician and neurologist
Arnold Pick (1851–1924), psychiatrist
Leopold Hilsner (1876–1928), Jewish man who became a victim of the false charge & pogrom
Růžena Vacková (1901–1982), art historian and theatre critic
Jaroslava Blažková (1933–2017), Slovak writer

Twin towns – sister cities

Velké Meziříčí is twinned with:
 České Meziříčí, Czech Republic
 Tisno, Croatia
 Valašské Meziříčí, Czech Republic
 Vansbro, Sweden

Gallery

References

External links

Cities and towns in the Czech Republic
Populated places in Žďár nad Sázavou District
Shtetls